Fenimorea moseri is a species of sea snail, a marine gastropod mollusk in the family Drilliidae.

The subspecies Fenimorea moseri brunnescens Rehder, 1943 is accepted as Fenimorea moseri (Dall, 1889)

Description
The length of the shell varies between 20 mm and 35 mm; its diameter 10 mm.

(Original description) The color of the shell varies from a rich rose color, with paler bands on the base, fasciole, etc., to yellowish white. The protoconch contains two whorls, followed by nine or ten subsequent whorls. The spiral sculpture consists of numerous very shallow grooves with wider flat interspaces. The grooves are cross-striated by close-set fine elevated incremental lines. This sculpture is very easily eroded and sometimes nearly absent. The transverse sculpture consists of about eleven strong wave-like ribs with wider interspaces, the crests rounded.  These extend from the suture to the base, and are narrowed and curved like the top of an interrogation point when they pass over the fasciole. The fasciole is constricted rather than excavated, the grooving is closer and finer than on the rest of the shell, and if the shell is colored the fasciole is paler. The whorl is strongly appressed at the suture and a little undulated by the ribs. The aperture is rather narrow. The anal sulcus is large and rounded. The callus is thick and elevated. The columella is nearly straight. The siphonal canal is short, wide and turned to the right. The siphonal fasciole is strong. The varix is large and stout.

Distribution
This species occurs in the demersal zone of the Gulf of Mexico; in the Atlantic Ocean off the Bahamas, North Carolina, the Florida Keys and Brazil.

This species was also found as a fossil in the strata of the Caloosahatchee Formation, Quaternary of Florida at North St Petersburg.

References

  W.H. Dall (1889) A preliminary catalogue of the shell-bearing marine mollusks and brachiopods of the southeastern coast of the United States, with illustrations of many of the species; Bulletin of the United States National Museum ; no. 37.
  Tucker, J.K. 2004 Catalog of recent and fossil turrids (Mollusca: Gastropoda). Zootaxa 682:1–1295

External links
 Rosenberg, G., F. Moretzsohn, and E. F. García. 2009. Gastropoda (Mollusca) of the Gulf of Mexico, Pp. 579–699 in Felder, D.L. and D.K. Camp (eds.), Gulf of Mexico–Origins, Waters, and Biota. Biodiversity. Texas A&M Press, College Station, Texas
  Fallon P.J. (2016). Taxonomic review of tropical western Atlantic shallow water Drilliidae (Mollusca: Gastropoda: Conoidea) including descriptions of 100 new species. Zootaxa. 4090(1): 1–363
 

moseri
Gastropods described in 1889